Postville is an Inuit town in the north of Labrador, Canada. It had a population of 188 as of 2021. It is located about  into the interior of Kaipokok Bay,  NNE of Happy Valley-Goose Bay. Postville Airport is nearby.

Postville is inaccessible by road and may be reached only by air or sea.

In the 18th century, the Franco-Canadian merchant Louis Fornel landed near the present site of Rigolet and claimed the land for France in 1743. The Franco-Canadians established trading posts in Kaipokok Bay at that time.

The English took control of the Labrador coast in 1763 after the Seven Years' War. This brought a flood of European fishermen and whalers to settle on the Labrador coast.

Around 1784, Pierre Marcoux and Louis Marchand reopened the old Kaipokok trading post. In 1795, the Moravian Brothers of Hopedale observed that Pierre Marcoux and the former partner of George Cartwright Collingham were the first Europeans to settle in Kaipokok Bay.

In order to compete with the Moravians, the Hudson's Bay Company established a coastal trading post in Kaipokok Bay in 1837 shortly after Rigolet. The counter was operated until 1878.

The village was first known as The Post because of the Hudson's Bay Company trading post located in the area. Inuit families traded in the fall, winter and spring before returning to the coastal camps in the summer. The village was renamed Postville in the 1940s by a pastor who helped establish the community by building a school and a church.

Uranium deposits are located near Postville.

Demographics 

References

Inuit community governments in Newfoundland and Labrador
Populated places in Labrador
Road-inaccessible communities of Newfoundland and Labrador
Fishing communities in Canada